Adolf Hofer or Höfer  may refer to:

 Adolf Hofer (luger), Austrian luger
 Adolf Hofer (politician) (1868–1935), Prussian Junker and Social Democratic politician
 Adolf Höfer (painter) (1869–1927), German landscape and portrait painter